Frans Duijts (born May 10, 1979 in Tiel), is a Dutch singer and former André Hazes-imitator

Biography 
Duijts began his singing career as an André Hazes imitator. But because of the success of the song Je denkt maar dat je alles mag van mij (You think that everything you do is alright with me), a cover of an André Hazes song from 1986 (written by Pierre Kartner), Duijts decided to increase his focus on his own singing career. Meanwhile Duijts already had six hits in the Single Top 100. His album Zo ben ik mezelf (This way I can be myself) was a great success, and remained in the Album Top 100 for the maximum allowed chart-time of two years. Besides singing, he also works in the family business, a demolition company in Tiel.

In 2009 Duijts received the prize for the Nederpop hit with the most plays in pubs and restaurants in that year for his single Je denkt maar dat je alles mag van mij.

Discography

Albums 

|- align=center
|align=left|Zo ben ik Daan||2008||October 4, 2008||7||104|| Gold
|- align=center
|align=left|Denken dat je alles mag...||2006||June 6, 2009||39||15||
|- align=center
|align=left|Leef je droom||February 19, 2010||February 27, 2010||2||43|| Gold
|- align=center
|align=left|Tijdloos||2016||October 29, 2016||15||||
|}

Singles 

|- align=center
|align=left|Samen One-Night Song||2007||-|||||| No. 82 on the Single Top 100
|- align=center
|align=left|Jij denkt maar dat jij alles mag van mij||2008||-|||||| No. 32 on the Single Top 100
|- align=center
|align=left|Komt een man bij de dokter||2008||-|||||| No. 14 on the Single Top 100
|- align=center
|align=left|Lieveling||2009||-|||||| No. 22 on the Single Top 100
|- align=center
|align=left|Nee, niet zeggen hoe ik poepen moet||2009||-|||||| No. 27 on the Single Top 100
|- align=center
|align=left|Ik mis je||January 8, 2010||-|||||| No. 4 on the Single Top 100
|- align=center
|align="left"|Altijd te laat naar bed||April 23, 2010||-|||||| No. 10 on the Single Top 100
|-
|align="left"|Lach en leef je dromen||August 13, 2010||-|||||| No. 18 on the Single Top 100
|-
|align="left"|Kom terug in mij||November 27, 2010||-|||||| No. 28 on the Single Top 100
|-
|align="left"|Morgen is pas morgen||2011|||||||| No. 1 on the Single Top 100
|}

References

1979 births
Living people
Dutch levenslied singers
Musicians from North Brabant
People from Tiel
21st-century Dutch singers